Jason Berry (born 1949) is an American investigative reporter, author and film director based in New Orleans, Louisiana. He is known for pioneering investigative reporting on sexual abuse in the priesthood of the Catholic Church.

Life 
He attended Jesuit High School in New Orleans, graduating in 1966.  
Berry is a graduate of Georgetown University.

His book Lead Us Not into Temptation: Catholic Priests and the Sexual Abuse of Children (1992) was the first major book on this issue. His 2004 book Vows of Silence deals with the sexual abuse of Marcial Maciel, the founder of the Legion of Christ, and the cover-up of that abuse. The author also adapted Vows of Silence into a film. Berry has been frequently interviewed in national media in the United States, has worked as a consultant for ABC News, and contributed to the National Public Radio and is a speaker on sexual abuse issues and popular culture.

Berry has also written books and news articles on music, particularly jazz, and co-wrote Up from the Cradle of Jazz: New Orleans Music Since World War II with Jonathan Foose and Tad Jones.

Awards 
Berry won his first Catholic Press Association Award in 1986 for his original coverage in the National Catholic Reporter of the clergy sexual-abuse scandals in Louisiana, notably including the priest Gilbert Gauthe. He was awarded his second in 1993 for the publication of Lead Us Not into Temptation: Catholic Priests and the Sexual Abuse of Children.  He was a recipient of the Alicia Patterson Journalism Fellowship for his reportage of David Duke. He and his wife live in New Orleans.

Berry won an Alicia Patterson Journalism Fellowship in 1992, covering Louisiana's political demagogues.

Books
Up from the Cradle of Jazz: New Orleans Music Since World War II Athens: The University of Georgia Press, 1986. , 
Lead Us Not Into Temptation: Catholic Priests and the Sexual Abuse of Children (1992) Re-issued, March 27, 2000 by University of Illinois Press. 
The Spirit of Black Hawk: A Mystery of Africans and Indians (1995)
Vows of Silence New York ; London: Free Press, 2004. , 
Last of the Red Hot Poppas Seattle: Chin Music Press, 2006. , 
City of a Million Dreams : A History of New Orleans at Year 300,  Chapel Hill: The University of North Carolina Press, 2018. ,

Filmography
Vows of Silence, director
 Up from the Cradle of Jazz, director

References

External links
 

Living people
American investigative journalists
Media coverage of Catholic Church sexual abuse scandals
21st-century American historians
21st-century American male writers
Historians of Mississippi
Jazz writers
Georgetown University alumni
Jesuit High School (New Orleans) alumni
American male non-fiction writers
1949 births